The 1995 Waigani Convention is a treaty that bans the exporting of hazardous or radioactive waste to Pacific Islands Forum countries, and prohibits Forum island countries from importing such waste. The convention has been ratified by Australia, Cook Islands, Fiji, Kiribati, Federated States of Micronesia, New Zealand, Niue, Papua New Guinea, Samoa, Solomon Islands, Tonga, Tuvalu, and Vanuatu. It entered into force in 2001.

States that are eligible to ratify the convention but have not yet done so are France, the United Kingdom, Marshall Islands, the United States, and Palau. Palau has signed the agreement but has not ratified it.

References

Treaties concluded in 1995
1995 in Papua New Guinea
Treaties entered into force in 2001
Treaties of Australia
Treaties of the Cook Islands
Treaties of Fiji
Treaties of Kiribati
Treaties of the Federated States of Micronesia
Treaties of New Zealand
Treaties of Niue
Treaties of Papua New Guinea
Treaties of Samoa
Treaties of the Solomon Islands
Treaties of Tonga
Treaties of Tuvalu
Treaties of Vanuatu
Pacific Islands Forum treaties